The 21st International 500-Mile Sweepstakes Race was held at the Indianapolis Motor Speedway on Tuesday, May 30, 1933. Louis Meyer defeated Wilbur Shaw by a time of 401.89 seconds (6.69 minutes). The race was part of the 1933 AAA Championship Car season.

Meyer was accompanied by riding mechanic Lawson Harris.

The 1933 month of May at Indianapolis was the deadliest running of the 500. Five participants were fatally injured. During practice, Bill Denver and his riding mechanic Bob Hurst were killed in a crash. On race day, Mark Billman was killed in a crash on lap 79 while Lester Spangler and his riding mechanic G.L. "Monk" Jordan were killed in a crash on lap 132. It was the fifth straight year at least one competitor died in a crash during the month.

Time trials
Ten-lap (25 mile) qualifying runs were utilized. 42 cars averaged faster than the designated 100mph mark, making for the largest starting field in the race's history.

Race summary and results

Bill Cummings led early on from the pole, turning laps of 113 mph. He faded from the front and dropped out with mechanical problems. Louis Meyer came from 7th starting position to first lead at 325 miles. By 400 miles, he had a commanding lead and was signaled "E-Z" by his pit crew to slow from his 110 mph pace. He cruised to the checkered with a lead of over 5 laps over Wilbur Shaw, with a new record average speed.

Alternates
First alternate: Sam Palmer 
Howdy Wilcox II had qualified for the race, but officials disqualified him from the field when they learned that he had diabetes. On race day, he was replaced in the car by Mauri Rose.

Failed to Qualify

Al Aspen (#42)
George Barringer (#54)
Paul Butler (#56)
Ray Carter  (#63)
Terry Curley  (#66)
Frank Davidson  (#76)
Danny Day 
Leon DeHart  (#55)
Bill Denver (#42) - Fatal accident
Harry Falt  (#71)
Speed Gardner (#31)
George Howie (#48) - Withdrew
L. A. Lariviere  (#75)
Harry Lewis  (#44)
Virgil Livengood  (#69)
Jack Mertz  (#79)
Roy Painter  (#72)
Phil Shafer (#7)
Overton Snell  (#52)
Bill Sockwell  (#74)
Howdy Wilcox II (#3) - Replaced by Mauri Rose
Doc Williams  (#66)

Race details
For 1933, riding mechanics were required.

Despite the deadly month, three rules were installed to make the racing safer. Cars were allowed a maximum of 6 quarts of oil, and could not add oil during the race (a rule still in place today). These changes meant to send "leakers" to the garage and not make the track slippery. Also, fuel tanks were a maximum of 15 gallons, instead of 40 gallons or more. Cars would have to pit more often for fuel and crews could inspect tire wear and other problems.

"Will Overhead"
In 1933, one of the more famous bits of Indy 500 nostalgia occurred. Telegraph was still being used to transmit race information to newspapers and other outlets across the United States. George Zanaon, a typesetter for The World-Independent newspaper in the town of Walsenburg, Colorado was preparing a story for that day's Indianapolis 500. Since Memorial Day was a holiday, his young editor John B. Kirkpatrick was alone monitoring the Associated Press wire for race updates. The race took several hours to complete, and the AP wire was shut down prior to the finish. Fitzpatrick had nearly the entire story ready for print, minus the winner of the race. A helpful AP editor in Denver advised him that he would send the name of the winner via Western Union telegraph.

The telegraph Kirkpatrick received, in typical newspaper shorthand lingo was: "WILL OVERHEAD WINNER OF INDIANAPOLIS 500," meaning that he would send the information by telegraph when the information was available. The young editor misunderstood the jargon in the message, and interpreted it as saying a driver named Will Overhead was the winner. The headline read "Will Overhead won the Indianapolis Memorial Day race today. At the two hundred fifty mile post Babe Stapp was leading the string of racing cars, but gave way to Overhead on then last half of the 500 mile grind." The true winner was Louis Meyer. The gaffe put the town of Walsenburg, and The World-Independent newspaper (now known as the Huerfano World Journal), on the map in racing circles.

References

 1933 Indianapolis 500 - Racing Reference

Indianapolis 500 races
Indianapolis 500
Indianapolis 500
1933 in American motorsport